Get Lucky  may refer to:

Albums
 Get Lucky (Johnny Coppin album), 1982
 Get Lucky (The Lascivious Biddies album), 2004
 Get Lucky (Little River Band album), 1990
 Get Lucky (Loverboy album), 1981
 Get Lucky (Mark Knopfler album), 2009
 Get Lucky: Lucky Ali Greatest Hits, an album by Lucky Ali, 2009

Songs
 "Get Lucky" (Daft Punk song), 2013
 "Get Lucky" (Jermaine Stewart song), 1987
 "Get Lucky", by Dragonette from Galore
 "Get Lucky", by Heatmiser from Mic City Sons
 "Get Lucky", by New Young Pony Club from Fantastic Playroom

Film
 Get Lucky, a 2013 film featuring Luke Treadaway